The Regional Council of Auvergne was the deliberative assembly of the former French region of Auvergne. The assembly sat in Clermont-Ferrand.

The regional council was made up of 47 regional councilors elected from its departments, distributed as:

 11 from Allier;
 5 from Cantal;
 8 from Haute-Loire;
 23 from Puy-de-Dôme

Headquarters 
The headquarters of the Regional Council was first located in Chamalières in the Carrefour Europe district, at 13-15 Avenue de Fontmaure.

The Regional Council moved between March and April 2014 to 59, boulevard Léon-Jouhaux in Montferrand. The various services were grouped together in a single low-consumption building built near the Roger-Quilliot art museum.

The merger with the Rhône-Alpes region and the attachment of services and functions to the metropolis of Lyon led to the desertion of the building, the "usefulness" of which was questioned just a few days after its inauguration, the overall cost of which had cost the Auvergne region more than 80 million euros. After long controversies over the possibility of selling it or keeping it to host parliamentary sessions, the building was finally sublet to startups specializing in digital activities, to services in the metropolis of Clermont-Ferrand including the GIP Quartier numérique with budgetary management regularly pinpointed by the Court of Auditors.

Its inauguration took place on June 21, 2014.

Presidents of the Regional Council 
The Auvergne regional council has had six presidents:

Budget 
In 2014, the budget for the Auvergne region was 675 million euros, including 139 million for transport, 100 for education and high schools, 115 for vocational training and apprenticeship, and 51 for economic action.

In 2015, the budget amounted to 671 million euros, including 138 million for transport, 97 for education and high schools, 115 for vocational training and apprenticeship, and 55 for economic action.

References 

Politics of Auvergne
Auvergne